Pisano is a surname. Notable people with the surname include:

Albert P. Pisano (born 1954), American engineer
Andrea Pisano (1290–1348), Italian sculptor and architect
Andrea Pisano (water polo) (born 1961), Italian water polo player
Bernardo Pisano (1490–1548), Italian composer of the early 16th century
Berto Pisano (1928–2002), Italian composer, conductor, arranger and musician
Bonanno Pisano Italian sculptor, sometimes credited with being the architect of the Leaning Tower of Pisa
Edmundo Pisano  (1919–1997), Chilean botanist and geographer
Eros Pisano, (born 1987), Italian footballer
Etta D. Pisano, American radiologist
Francesco Pisano (born 1986), Italian footballer
Franco Pisano (1922–1977), Italian composer, conductor, arranger, and musician
Gary Pisano, American economist
Giorgio Pisanò (1924–1997), Italian journalist and politician
Giovanni Pisano (–), Italian sculptor
Giunta Pisano, Italian painter
Giuseppe Pisano (born 1988), Italian-born German footballer
Isabel Pisano (born 1948), Uruguayan actress and journalist
Joel A. Pisano (1949–2021), American judge
John Pisano (born 1931), American jazz musician
Leonardo Pisano (–), Italian mathematician also known as Fibonacci
Manuel Pisano (born 2006) Italian footballer
Marco Pisano (born 1981) Italian footballer
Margarita Pisano (1932–2015), Chilean architect and feminist
Matías Pisano (born 1991), Argentine footballer
Nicola Pisano (–), Italian sculptor
Nicolás Pisano (born 1982), Argentine footballer
Nino Pisano, Italian sculptor
Oscar Pisano (born 1956), Argentine footballer
Paola Pisano (born 1977), Italian academic and politician
Rosita Pisano  (1919–1975), Italian actress

See also 

 Pisano (disambiguation)
 Pisani